The 2011–12 McNeese State Cowboys basketball team represented McNeese State University in the 2011–12 NCAA Division I men's basketball season. The Cowboys, led by head coach Dave Simmons, played their home games at the Burton Coliseum in Lake Charles, Louisiana, as members of the Southland Conference. After finishing 4th in the Southland during the regular season, the Cowboys made a run to the championship game of the Southland Conference tournament, where they were defeated by Lamar.

McNeese State failed to qualify for the NCAA tournament, but received a bid to the 2012 CollegeInsider.com Postseason Tournament. The Cowboys were eliminated in the first round of the CIT by Toledo, 76–63.

Roster 

Source

Schedule and results

|-
!colspan=9 style=|Regular season

|-
!colspan=9 style=| Southland Tournament

|-
!colspan=9 style=| CollegeInsider.com Tournament

Source

References

McNeese Cowboys basketball seasons
McNeese State
McNeese State
McNeese State Cowboys basketball
McNeese State Cowboys basketball